Virginia Pound (July 26, 1917 – April 30, 2017), known professionally as Lorna Gray and (after 1945) Adrian Booth, was an American film actress known for her comic roles, and later as a villainess. She is best known for her roles in Columbia Pictures comedy shorts and Republic Pictures serials.

Early years
Gray was born in Grand Rapids, Michigan. After her father's millinery business was a victim of the Great Depression, the family split up. Before appearing in films, Gray sang with a group in Cleveland called Ben Yost's Varsity Coeds, who performed primarily in movie theaters before the movie began.

Career
Although she had a film test at Universal Studios and a brief contract with Paramount Pictures, she made her first big film for Columbia Pictures.

As a Columbia contract player she appeared in the studio's shorts and serials, including Flying G-Men (starring Robert Paige), Pest from the West (starring Buster Keaton), and You Nazty Spy! (starring The Three Stooges). When her Columbia contract lapsed, she found work at Monogram Pictures, where she worked with action star Frankie Darro.

Gray also starred opposite John Wayne in Red River Range (1938) and appeared in the title role in O, My Darling Clementine (1943), a country music film starring Roy Acuff as a singing sheriff.

In her Paramount films, such as Hold 'Em Navy, she was credited as Virginia Pound, but she was given the name Lorna Gray by Columbia and she used it from 1938 until 1945, when she left Columbia and moved to Republic Pictures. She appeared as Lorna Gray in Republic's Federal Operator 99, but subsequently adopted the name Adrian Booth.

At Republic, she often received co-star billing in Westerns, the only woman other than Dale Evans to be billed so highly at that studio. She also starred in Republic's serial about the comic book superhero Captain America.

Personal life
In 1945, shortly after signing a contract with Republic Pictures, she and the stunt performer Ruel F. Taylor were arrested for "suspicion of possessing marijuana in Los Angeles." A $1,000 bail set her free. She was later exonerated after Taylor testified at his preliminary hearing that Gray had not used the marijuana and was not aware of it.

She married actor David Brian on July 19, 1949, and retired from motion pictures in 1951. As Adrian Booth, she was awarded the Golden Boot Award in 1998 and attended film festivals into her nineties. She appeared as a guest at the annual Three Stooges convention held in Fort Washington, Pennsylvania, on April 30, 2011.

Death
Gray died in Sherman Oaks, California on April 30, 2017, aged 99.

Filmography

References

External links
 
 
 

1917 births
2017 deaths
Actresses from Grand Rapids, Michigan
American film actresses
Film serial actresses
Paramount Pictures contract players
Western (genre) film actresses
20th-century American actresses
21st-century American women